Gränslots (Border Guide) is a Swedish drama film from 1990 directed by Lars-Göran Pettersson. The film was Pettersson's debut as a director, and he also write the screenplay. The film was edited into a TV series and broadcast on SVT2 in 1993. In addition to Swedish actors, the cast includes many Norwegian actors.

Plot
The Swede Henry Eriksson helps his friends and relatives on the other side of the Norwegian border during World War II. He also helps refugees.

Cast

 Line Storesund as Tove 
 Anton Hjärtmyr as Sigge 
 Göran Engman as Henry, Sigge's father 
 Sigrid Huun as Torunn, Sigge's mother
 Bo Lindström as Sigges grandfather
 Bjørn Sundquist as Ragnar, Tove's father 
 Helge Jordal as a Norwegian policeman
 Bo Montelius as Åkerberg, the district police superintendent
 Gerhard Hoberstrofer as the forest ranger's assistant
 Kicki Rundgren as the maid
 Unni Kristin Skagestad as the dark-haired woman

References

External links 
 
 Gränslots at the Swedish Film Database

1990 films
Swedish drama films
1990s Swedish-language films
1990s Norwegian-language films
1990 drama films
1990 multilingual films
Swedish multilingual films
1990s Swedish films